Elinor Jessie Marie Hallé  (1856 – 18 May 1926) was a British sculptor and inventor. She is known for her work on medals and for devising the idea of creating plaster casts as splints for broken limbs during the First World War.

Life
Halle was born in Manchester in 1856. Her parents were Sir Charles Hallé and his first wife, Marie.  Her father started the Hallé Orchestra. Her French mother died in 1866. Her older brother was the painter Charles Edward Hallé (born c. 1847).

Hallé studied sculpture at the Slade School of Fine Art under Alphonse Legros. She was a member of the group of medallists known as the Slade Girls. Her medal of Cardinal Newman won top prize at the 1885 International Inventions Exhibition.

Hallé did the modelling for a number of important awards and this included the 1890 Royal Geographical Society Medal.

During the First World War Halle volunteered with the Surgical Requisites Association. The association supplied medical dressings and had been created by Queen Mary’s Needlework Guild. Anne Acheson and Halle were both sculptors and they witnessed soldiers returning from the front with broken limbs held together with only wooden splints and basic bandages, it was suggested that taking a plaster cast of the limb. Then when the cast had hardened they could wrap it with papier-mache. It could then be placed on the broken limb whilst the bones knitted. This was inspired by the plaster of Paris in use in their sculptural work. The anatomically correct papier-mache splint reduced the healing time while supporting the broken bone. The idea of using plaster of Paris was adopted and refined over the years and is still in use today by the medical profession.

She was awarded a CBE after the war.

She died in 1926.

Works
 Cardinals Manning Medal
 Cardinal Mercier Medal
 Cardinal Newman Medal 
 the Royal Geographical Society Emin Pasha Relief Expedition Medal, 1890
 A medal for her father. 
 She made the collar for the Royal Victorian Order
 the insignia of the Order of the British Empire and the order of the Companions of Honour.

References

1856 births
1926 deaths
19th-century British women artists
Alumni of the Slade School of Fine Art
Artists from Manchester
British sculptors